UFC 34: High Voltage was a mixed martial arts event held by the Ultimate Fighting Championship at the MGM Grand Garden Arena in Las Vegas, Nevada on November 2, 2001.

History
The card was headlined by two Championship Bouts, Randy Couture faced Pedro Rizzo for the Heavyweight Title, and Matt Hughes faced Carlos Newton for the Welterweight Title. 

UFC 34 marked the first appearance of future Heavyweight Champion Frank Mir. 

The broadcast had technical issues, as the commentators could barely be heard, consistently being drowned out by the crowd and ring noise. 

During the Matt Hughes and Carlos Newton fight Hughes was clearly heard telling his corner several times that he "was out", after winning the fight by TKO. This conforms to Carlos Newton's assertion that he believed Hughes was "out", thus collapsing and leading to Newtons head colliding with the canvas.

The event was seen live on pay-per-view in the United States, and later released on home video.

Results

See also 
 Ultimate Fighting Championship
 List of UFC champions
 List of UFC events
 2001 in UFC

External links
 Official UFC website
 Sherdog.com
 UFC34 fights review

References

Ultimate Fighting Championship events
2001 in mixed martial arts
Mixed martial arts in Las Vegas
2001 in sports in Nevada
MGM Grand Garden Arena